The Russian naval facility in Tartus is a leased military installation of the Russian Navy located on the northern edge of the sea port of the Syrian city of Tartus. Up until 2017, Russian official usage classified the installation as a Material-Technical Support Point and not as a base. Tartus is the Russian Navy's only Mediterranean repair and replenishment point, sparing Russia’s warships the trip back to their Black Sea bases through the Turkish Straits.

The Tartus facility currently can accommodate four medium-sized vessels but only if both of its  floating piers, inside the northern breakwater, are operational. It is however, in theory at least, presently able to support limited vertical replenishment operations for those larger warships.

Current legal status, use, and strength

On 18 January 2017, Russia and Syria signed an agreement, effective forthwith, whereunder Russia would be allowed to expand and use the naval facility at Tartus for 49 years on a free-of-charge basis and enjoy sovereign jurisdiction over the base. The treaty allows Russia to keep up to 11 ships at Tartus, including nuclear vessels; it  stipulates privileges and full immunity from Syria′s jurisdiction for Russia′s personnel and materiel at the facility. The treaty was ratified and approved by Russian parliament, and the relevant federal law was signed by president Vladimir Putin by the end of December 2017.

In late December 2017, Russia announced it had set about ″forming a permanent grouping" at the Tartus naval facility as well as at its Hmeymim airbase, after president Putin approved the structure and the personnel strength of the Tartus and Hmeymim bases.

The Russian facility at Tartus has been used for delivering armaments and supplies by Russian dock landing ships and cargo ships that pass the Straits from the Russian Black Sea port in Novorossiysk to Syria (the Syrian Express) — for the purposes of Russia′s military operation that began on 30 September 2015 as well as for the Syrian Arab Army. According to media reports in September 2015, a drastic intensification of traffic of the Syrian Express was noted since mid-August 2015.

In April 2019, senior Russian officials were reported to have had talks with the Syrian government; Russian deputy prime minister Yury Borisov was quoted as saying that a contract on renting the Tartus port by Russia for "use by Russian business" was expected to be signed shortly.

History

1971 to 2012 
The Soviet Union established a facility at Tartus during the Cold War in accordance with a Soviet–Syrian agreement concluded in 1971, with a view of supporting the Soviet Navy′s 5th Operational Squadron in the Mediterranean, which the Soviets saw as a counterbalance to the  U.S. Sixth Fleet headquartered in Italy (then in Gaeta).

In the early 1970s the Soviet Union had similar support points located in Egypt, Ethiopia (Eritrea), Vietnam and elsewhere. In 1977, the Soviet Navy evacuated its Egyptian support bases at Alexandria and Mersa Matruh and transferred the ships and property to Tartus, where it transformed the naval support facility into the 229th Naval and Estuary Vessel Support Division.

In 1984 Moscow upgraded the Tartus support point to the 720th Material-Technical Support Point.

In December 1991 the Soviet Union dissolved; the Soviet Mediterranean 5th Operational Squadron (composed of ships from the Northern Fleet, the Baltic Fleet, and the Black Sea Fleet) ceased to exist in December 1992. Since then, the Russian Navy  has occasionally deployed ships and submarines to the Mediterranean Sea.

As Russia wrote off 73% of Syria's $13.4 billion  Soviet-era debt in 2005 and became Syria's main arms supplier, Russia and Syria held talks about allowing Russia to develop and enlarge its naval facility, so that Russia could strengthen its naval presence in the Mediterranean. Amid Russia's deteriorating relations with the West, because of the 2008 South Ossetia War and of plans to deploy a US missile defense shield in Poland, an unsourced article said that President Assad reportedly agreed to the port's conversion into a permanent Middle East base for Russia's nuclear-armed warships.

In September 2008 a second floating pier was built at the facility, following the discussion of the issue between presidents of Russia and Syria in August. Meanwhile, mass media and officials of Russia, Israel, and Syria were making contradictory statements about Russian warships planning to call at Tartus as well as about the prospects of upgrading the facility to a naval base.

In July 2009, the Russian military announced they would modernise the Tartus facility.

During the Syrian Civil War prior to Russian intervention

Media reports in March 2012 suggested that Russian  special-forces had arrived at the Tartus port. According to a TASS report published in December 2017, the Tartus facility has been used for supplies of Russian armaments and military cargo since June 2012. Back in June 2012, Russian officials denied reports that they were reinforcing the garrison at Tartus with marines. About 50 Russian sailors and specialist technicians were said to be stationed there then.

On 3 August 2012, international media reported that three large Russian amphibious assault ships, carrying hundreds of marines would soon visit Tartus. Earlier reports, quoting a source at the Russian General Staff, said the ships would spend a few days in Tartus and would take on fresh supplies of food and water. British media added that the ships each had up to 120 marines on board. The Russian Defence Ministry left open the possibility that the ships might dock there at some point for logistical reasons, saying they had every right to do so. The unnamed General Staff source had said that after calling in at Tartus, they would head for the Bosphorus and the Russian Black Sea port of Novorossiysk. The ships, part of Russia's Northern Fleet, were Aleksandr Otrakovskiy, Georgiy Pobedonosets and Kondopoga, all s. The source, quoted by Interfax news agency, said one would anchor off Tartus and the other two would use a floating pier, because the port facilities were limited. There was speculation that Russia may begin evacuating its nationals from Syria and deploy Marines to protect personnel and equipment, as the violence intensifies (about 30,000 Russian citizens were said to be living in Syria).

In May 2013, a U.S. newspaper reported that Russia had sent a dozen or more warships to patrol waters near Tartus, a move that was seen as a warning to the U.S. and Israel not to intervene in the conflict in Syria.

At the end of June 2013, Russian deputy foreign minister Mikhail Bogdanov said in an interview that the facility did not have any strategic or military importance and that Russia had evacuated all civilian and military personnel from Tartus and Syria (″Presently, the Russian Defense Ministry has not a single person stationed in Syria″).
This information was then confirmed by the Russian Defense Ministry.

After the Permanent task force of the Russian Navy in the Mediterranean Sea was formed in September 2013, the facility at Tartus was charged with servicing and repairs of the ships of that formation.

See also

 Russian intelligence facility at Tel Al-Hara

Notes

References

Tartus
Buildings and structures in Tartus
Military units and formations established in 1977
1977 establishments in Syria
Soviet Union–Syria relations
Russia–Syria relations
Russian involvement in the Syrian civil war
Tartus
Military installations of the Soviet Union in other countries
Military installations of Russia in Syria
Military installations established in 1977